Dimitrios Sotiriou (born 13 September 1987) is a Greek professional footballer who plays as a goalkeeper for Super League club OFI.

Career
Born in Martino, Boeotia, Sotiriou began playing football with local side Fostiras. He was the club's first choice goalkeeper from January 2006 to the end of 2008–09 season, making 53 appearances.

On 18 June 2009 he was officially announced as a Larissa player. In July 2012 he didn't follow the team's preparation due to a financial dispute and was eventually released. On 10 June 2018 he joined OFI on a free transfer. On 27 May 2019, he extended his contract until the summer of 2021.

References

External links

Profile at EPAE.org
Profile at Onsports.gr
Profile at Insports.eu 

1987 births
Living people
Greek footballers
Association football goalkeepers
Fostiras F.C. players
Athlitiki Enosi Larissa F.C. players
Ethnikos Piraeus F.C. players
Ermis Aradippou FC players
PAS Giannina F.C. players
Platanias F.C. players
Levadiakos F.C. players
OFI Crete F.C. players
Greek expatriate sportspeople in Cyprus
Expatriate footballers in Cyprus
Greek expatriate footballers
Football League (Greece) players
Cypriot Second Division players
Super League Greece players
People from Phthiotis
Footballers from Central Greece